The Clyde Wind Farm is a  522 megawatt (MW) wind farm near Abington in South Lanarkshire, Scotland.

Planning
The first stage of the project consists of 152-turbines by Scottish and Southern Energy and was approved by the Scottish Parliament in July 2008. It is capable of powering 200,000 homes. SSE was given planning permission to build a wind farm with turbines built on either side of the M74 motorway.

Construction
Construction of the wind farm, which was budgeted for £600 million, began in early 2009 and finished in 2012. Welcon Towers Ltd won the contract to supply the towers for all 152 turbines for the £600 million Clyde Wind Farm.  Jesper Øhlenschlæger, chief executive officer of Welcon Towers parent company Skykon, said: ‘The Clyde project is a very important business win for our Campbeltown manufacturing.  Scotland has become the most positive and the most interesting renewable wind power market in Europe. The Clyde Wind Farm project represents a landmark phase in Scotland’s renewable energy strategy.’

The first stage of the farm was opened at a ceremonial ribbon cutting by First Minister of Scotland Alex Salmond in September 2012.

Original Capacity was 349.6MW.

Extension
In July 2014 it was announced that Scottish ministers had approved an extension to the Clyde Wind Farm. The extension will see 54 extra turbines, capable of generating an additional 162MW. This will bring the total generating capacity of the wind farm to 512MW. The extension has been upgraded to 54 turbines with a 173MW capacity and was commissioned in the summer of 2017.

See also

 Wind power in Scotland
 List of onshore wind farms in the United Kingdom
 List of offshore wind farms in the United Kingdom

References

External links

 SSE Clyde Project website
 Map of the Clyde Wind Farm

Wind farms in Scotland
Buildings and structures in South Lanarkshire